Rockaway Township is a township in Morris County, New Jersey, United States. As of the 2020 United States Census, the township's population was 25,341, reflecting an increase of 1,185 (+4.9%) from the 24,156 counted in the 2010 Census.

Rockaway Township was incorporated as a township by an act of the New Jersey Legislature on April 8, 1844, from portions of Hanover Township and Pequannock Township. Portions of the township were taken to form Rockaway Borough (June 19, 1894), Port Oram (June 26, 1895, now Wharton) and Denville Township (April 14, 1913). Portions of the township were annexed to Boonton Township in 1906 and to Rockaway Borough in 1908.

The township shares its name with the Rockaway River and the neighboring borough. The name is derived from a Native American term, variously said to mean "place of sands", "creek between two hills" or "bushy" / "difficult to cross".

Geography
According to the United States Census Bureau, the township had a total area of 45.89 square miles (118.85 km2), including 41.73 square miles (108.09 km2) of land and 4.16 square miles (10.77 km2) of water (9.06%).

Rockaway Township and its sister community, Rockaway Borough, and the area around the two municipalities are home to some scenic areas. These areas include lakes, rivers, and expansive ranges of mountains, covered with trees and wildlife and hiking trails, including Farny State Park, Wildcat Ridge WMA, Mount Hope Historical Park and Splitrock Reservoir.

Portions of the township are owned by the City of Newark, Essex County, for their Pequannock River Watershed, which provides water to the city from an area of  that also includes portions of Hardyston Township, Jefferson Township, Kinnelon, Vernon Township and West Milford. Newark's Pequannock Watershed is administered by the Newark Watershed Conservation and Development Corporation. The river keeper for the Pequannock River is the Pequannock River Coalition.

Two sites on the National Register of Historic Places are in Rockaway Township. Split Rock Furnace is a Civil War era iron ore furnace which is still intact. The Ford-Faesch Manor House, is a 1768 stone mansion that figured prominently during the Revolutionary War and in the 250-year history of Morris County iron industry.

Lake Telemark (with a 2010 Census population of 1,255) and White Meadow Lake (with 8,836 as of 2010
) are unincorporated communities and census-designated places (CDPs) located within Rockaway Township.

Other unincorporated communities, localities and place names located partially or completely within the township include Beach Glen, Deer Pond, Denmark, Bowlbyville, Durham Pond, Foxs Pond, Green Pond (a lake and an accompanying residential community, though it uses a Newfoundland address in West Milford), Hibernia (site of the Hibernia mines), Hickory Hill, Hilltown, Lyonsville, Marcella, Meriden, Middle Forge, Middletown, Mount Hope, Picatinny, Spicertown and Split Rock.

The New Jersey Department of Environmental Protection spent $3 million in 2015 to acquire a  buffer area around the reservoir, as part of an agreement under which Jersey City retains rights to use water from the reservoir and is responsible for maintenance of the dam at the site.

Rockaway Township borders the municipalities of Boonton Township, Denville Township, Dover, Jefferson Township, Kinnelon, Randolph Township, Rockaway and Wharton in Morris County; and West Milford in Passaic County.

Demographics

Census 2010

The Census Bureau's 2006–2010 American Community Survey showed that (in 2010 inflation-adjusted dollars) median household income was $95,530 (with a margin of error of +/− $5,122) and the median family income was $111,053 (+/− $5,557). Males had a median income of $75,475 (+/− $5,327) versus $52,586 (+/− $4,837) for females. The per capita income for the borough was $41,757 (+/− $1,898). About 0.8% of families and 1.4% of the population were below the poverty line, including 1.1% of those under age 18 and 2.0% of those age 65 or over.

Census 2000
As of the 2000 United States Census there were 22,930 people, 8,108 households, and 6,380 families residing in the township. The population density was 535.5 people per square mile (206.8/km2). There were 8,506 housing units at an average density of 198.7 per square mile (76.7/km2). The racial makeup of the township was 88.86% White, 2.46% African American, 0.10% Native American, 5.65% Asian, 0.02% Pacific Islander, 1.60% from other races, and 1.31% from two or more races. Hispanic or Latino of any race were 6.28% of the population.

There were 8,108 households, out of which 40.2% had children under the age of 18 living with them, 68.5% were married couples living together, 7.6% had a female householder with no husband present, and 21.3% were non-families. 17.0% of all households were made up of individuals, and 5.6% had someone living alone who was 65 years of age or older. The average household size was 2.82 and the average family size was 3.21.

In the township the population was spread out, with 27.1% under the age of 18, 5.5% from 18 to 24, 32.9% from 25 to 44, 25.1% from 45 to 64, and 9.4% who were 65 years of age or older. The median age was 37 years. For every 100 females, there were 97.7 males. For every 100 females age 18 and over, there were 94.5 males.

The median income for a household in the township was $80,939, and the median income for a family was $89,281. Males had a median income of $58,027 versus $40,038 for females. The per capita income for the township was $33,184. About 1.4% of families and 2.4% of the population were below the poverty line, including 2.6% of those under age 18 and 3.6% of those age 65 or over.

Economy

Picatinny Arsenal, a military research and manufacturing facility, dates back to 1880 when it was established as the Dover Powder Depot, before being renamed just days later as the Picatinny Powder Depot. With 5,000 employees and covering , Picatinny Arsenal is the Joint Center of Excellence for Armaments and Munitions for the United States Armed Forces.

Sports
In 2011, the North Jersey Lakers began play in the Eastern Basketball Alliance, a semi-professional men's winter basketball league.

Government

Local government 
Rockaway Township is governed within the Faulkner Act (formally known as the Optional Municipal Charter Law) under the Mayor-Council system of municipal government (Plan F), implemented based on the recommendations of a Charter Study Commission as of January 1, 1968. The township is one of 71 municipalities (of the 564) statewide that use this form of government. The governing body is comprised of the Mayor and the Township Council. The Mayor is directly elected by the voters. The Township Council is comprised of nine members, with one member elected from each of six wards and three elected on an at-large basis. The members of the governing body are elected to staggered four-year terms of office on a partisan basis in odd-numbered years as part of the November general election, with the six ward seats up for vote together and then the three at-large and the mayoral seat up for vote together two years later.

, the Mayor of Rockaway Township is Republican Joseph Jackson, who was appointed to serve a term of office expiring December 31, 2023. Members of the Township Council are Council President Council President Howard Kritz (R, 2023; At-large),Council Vice President Jonathan Sackett (D, 2025; Ward 4), Douglas Brookes (R, 2025; Ward 3), Rachel Brookes (R, 2025; Ward 6), Emanuel "Manny" Friedlander (D, 2025; Ward 5), Mary Noon (R, 2025; Ward 1), John J. Quinn Jr. (R, 2025; Ward 2), Adam Salberg (R, 2023; At-large) and Pawel Wojtowicz (R, 2023; At-large - appointed to serve an unexpired term).

In January 2022, Joseph Jackson was selected as mayor following the resignation of Michael Puzio from the term expiring in December 2023. In March 2022, Pawel Wojtowicz was appointed to fill Jackson's vacated at-large council seat, also expiring in December 2023, Jackson and Wojtowicz will serve on an interim basis until the November 2022 general election when voters will choose successors to serve the balance of the term of office for both seats.

In July 2019, Republican Mary Noon was appointed to fill the Ward 1 seat expiring in December 2021 that had been held by Victor Palumbo until he resigned from office the previous month in the face of a pending recall effort. In September 2019, the Borough Council appointed Douglas Brookes to fill the Ward 3 seat expiring in December 2021 that had been held by Phyllis I. Smith until she resigned from office earlier that month; at the same meeting, the council removed Jeremy Jedynak from office due to excessive absence, after he had missed attending a string of meetings over a two-month period.

Jedynak was designated as acting mayor after the death of Mayor Michael Dachisen of a cardiac arrest in August 2018, pending the selection of an interim successor. At the appointment deadline in September 2018, Paul Minenna, a former councilmember, was selected to serve as mayor on an interim basis; the meeting had been pushed off and rescheduled for 10:30 PM after the site that had been originally designated for the special meeting was no longer available. In October 2018, a Superior Court judge ruled that all of the actions taken at the late-night meeting in September at which Minenna had been appointed were null and void as they violated the terms of the state's Open Public Meetings Act; Adam Salberg was designated by the judge to fill the mayoral vacancy on an interim basis until the November 2018 general election, when voters will select a candidate to serve the balance of Dachisen's term of office.

Michael Dachisen was selected to serve as mayor in June 2012 after Louis S. Sceusi stepped down to take a position as judge in New Jersey Superior Court, and was sworn in as mayor in July 2012. In November 2012, Dachisen won a special election to serve the balance of Sceusi's term through 2015. Jeremy Jedynak took office in June 2013, filling the at-large seat held by John DiMaria, who left office to relocate outside of the state. The term expires in 2015 and the remaining two years of the seat were up for vote in the November 2013 general election.

Federal, state, and county representation 
Rockaway Township is located in the 11th Congressional District and is part of New Jersey's 26th state legislative district. Prior to the 2011 reapportionment following the 2010 Census, Rockaway Township had been in the 25th state legislative district.

 

Morris County is governed by a Board of County Commissioners comprised of seven members who are elected at-large in partisan elections to three-year terms on a staggered basis, with either one or three seats up for election each year as part of the November general election. Actual day-to-day operation of departments is supervised by County Administrator, John Bonanni. , Morris County's Commissioners are
Commissioner Director Tayfun Selen (R, Chatham Township, term as commissioner ends December 31, 2023; term as director ends 2022),
Commissioner Deputy Director John Krickus (R, Washington Township, term as commissioner ends 2024; term as deputy director ends 2022),
Douglas Cabana (R, Boonton Township, 2022), 
Kathryn A. DeFillippo (R, Roxbury, 2022),
Thomas J. Mastrangelo (R, Montville, 2022),
Stephen H. Shaw (R, Mountain Lakes, 2024) and
Deborah Smith (R, Denville, 2024).
The county's constitutional officers are the County Clerk and County Surrogate (both elected for five-year terms of office) and the County Sheriff (elected for a three-year term). , they are 
County Clerk Ann F. Grossi (R, Parsippany–Troy Hills, 2023),
Sheriff James M. Gannon (R, Boonton Township, 2022) and
Surrogate Heather Darling (R, Roxbury, 2024).

Politics
As of March 23, 2011, there were a total of 16,022 registered voters in Rockaway Township, of which 3,861 (24.1%) were registered as Democrats, 5,481 (34.2%) were registered as Republicans and 6,668 (41.6%) were registered as Unaffiliated. There were 12 voters registered as Libertarians or Greens.

In the 2012 presidential election, Republican Mitt Romney received 52.9% of the vote (6,410 cast), ahead of Democrat Barack Obama with 45.9% (5,562 votes), and other candidates with 1.3% (153 votes), among the 12,198 ballots cast by the township's 16,865 registered voters (73 ballots were spoiled), for a turnout of 72.3%. In the 2008 presidential election, Republican John McCain received 52.2% of the vote (6,770 cast), ahead of Democrat Barack Obama with 46.3% (5,998 votes) and other candidates with 1.0% (134 votes), among the 12,958 ballots cast by the township's 16,558 registered voters, for a turnout of 78.3%. In the 2004 presidential election, Republican George W. Bush received 55.9% of the vote (6,934 ballots cast), outpolling Democrat John Kerry with 43.3% (5,368 votes) and other candidates with 0.5% (87 votes), among the 12,411 ballots cast by the township's 16,057 registered voters, for a turnout percentage of 77.3.

In the 2013 gubernatorial election, Republican Chris Christie received 66.7% of the vote (5,071 cast), ahead of Democrat Barbara Buono with 31.5% (2,396 votes), and other candidates with 1.8% (137 votes), among the 7,726 ballots cast by the township's 16,708 registered voters (122 ballots were spoiled), for a turnout of 46.2%. In the 2009 gubernatorial election, Republican Chris Christie received 55.9% of the vote (4,855 ballots cast), ahead of  Democrat Jon Corzine with 33.8% (2,930 votes), Independent Chris Daggett with 8.6% (750 votes) and other candidates with 0.6% (53 votes), among the 8,681 ballots cast by the township's 16,190 registered voters, yielding a 53.6% turnout.

Education 
The Rockaway Township Public Schools serves students in kindergarten through eighth grade. As of the 2018–19 school year, the district, comprised of six schools, had an enrollment of 2,276 students and 224.5 classroom teachers (on an FTE basis), for a student–teacher ratio of 10.1:1. Schools in the district (with 2018–19 enrollment data from the National Center for Education Statistics) are
Birchwood Elementary School with 281 students in grades K–5,
Catherine A. Dwyer Elementary School with 292 students in grades K–5,
Katherine D. Malone Elementary School with 252 students in grades K–5,
Dennis B. O'Brien Elementary School with 309 students in grades Pre-K–5,
Stony Brook Elementary School with 359 students in grades K–5 and
Copeland Middle School with 774 students in grades 6–8.

Public school students in ninth through twelfth grades attend either Morris Hills High School (those living in the White Meadow Lake section and other southern portions of the township) or Morris Knolls High School (the remainder of the township). Morris Hills (located in Rockaway Borough) also serves students from Wharton and some from Rockaway Borough (those mostly north of Route 46); Morris Knolls (located in Denville) serves all students from Denville and portions of Rockaway Borough (those mostly south of Route 46). As of the 2018–19 school year, Morris Hills High School had an enrollment of 1,279 students and 118.4 classroom teachers (on an FTE basis), for a student–teacher ratio of 10.8:1 and Morris Knolls High School had an enrollment of 1,434 students and 128.4 classroom teachers (on an FTE basis), for a student–teacher ratio of 11.2:1. The Academy for Mathematics, Science, and Engineering, a magnet high school program that is part of the Morris County Vocational School District is jointly operated on the Morris Hills campus. The two high schools are part of the Morris Hills Regional High School District.

Transportation

Roads and highways

Interstate 80 passes through the township, including exits 35 and 37. U.S. Route 46 cuts through the southernmost area of the township, while Route 15 clips the southwestern portion of the township.

Public transportation
NJ Transit train service does not stop in the township, but is accessible at the Denville station on both the Morristown Line and the Montclair-Boonton Line.

NJ Transit bus service is provided on the 880 local route, which replaced service that had been provided up to 2010 on the MCM10 route.

NJ Transit eliminated service on the MCM5 and MCM7 routes as part of budget cuts.

Lakeland Bus Lines offers bus service from the Rockaway Townsquare Mall to the Port Authority Bus Terminal in Midtown Manhattan.

Fire department
There are five companies of the Rockaway Township Fire Department. Each company is all-volunteer and provides emergency medical services in addition to fire protection. The five stations are:
Hibernia Company #1
Mount Hope Company #2
Marcella Company #3, covering the northern portion of the township
Birchwood Company #4 covers the area around the Rockaway Townsquare Mall
White Meadow Lake Company #5, covers the southern portion of the township

Popular culture
 The 2003 independent film, The Station Agent, was filmed at various locations in the northern part of the township and elsewhere in the surrounding Morris County area.

Notable people

People who were born in, residents of, or otherwise closely associated with Rockaway Township include:

 Lou Benfatti (born 1971), former defensive tackle for the New York Jets (1994–1996)
 William E. Bishop (1932–2003), politician who served as mayor of Rockaway Township and represented the 25th Legislative District in the New Jersey General Assembly from 1982 to 1984
 Neal Casal (1968–2019), musician/photographer, member of Ryan Adams and the Cardinals
 Silas Duncan (1788–1834), recognized for his service in the United States Navy during the War of 1812 for his actions at the Battle of Lake Champlain
 Harry L. Ettlinger (1926–2018), one of the Monuments Men during World War II whose efforts were portrayed on film in The Monuments Men
 Russ Flanagan (1974–2008), journalist
 Frank Herbert (1931-2018), English teacher and politician who served in the New Jersey Senate from 1978 to 1982
 Thomas J. Hillery (1871–1920), President of the New Jersey Senate
 Lawrence Low (1920–1996), sailor who received a gold medal in the star class with the boat Kathleen at the 1956 Summer Olympics in Melbourne.
 Clifford Meth (born 1961), author and editor, lived in Rockaway from 1963 to 1980 and often references the town as the home of his fictional character "Hank Magitz"
 E. Bertram Mott (1879–1961), Chairman of the New Jersey Republican State Committee from 1927 to 1934 who served as County Clerk of Morris County for more than 50 years
 Raymond T. Odierno (1954-2021), Lieutenant General, United States Army and Commander US III Corps. A key officer in Operation Iraqi Freedom  Former Chief of Staff of the Army.
 Robert A. Roe (1924–2014), politician who represented New Jersey in the United States House of Representatives from 1969 to 1993

References

External links

Rockaway Township website
Rockaway Township Public Schools

School Data for the Rockaway Township Public Schools, National Center for Education Statistics
Rockaway Township Fire Department
Abandoned Mines of Rockaway Township & the NJ Highlands

Bordering municipalities

 
1844 establishments in New Jersey
Faulkner Act (mayor–council)
Populated places established in 1844
Townships in Morris County, New Jersey
Discontiguous municipalities in New Jersey